Jämsä is a town and municipality of Finland.

The municipality is officially Finnish-speaking.

The municipality of Kuorevesi was consolidated with Jämsä in 2001. The municipality of Längelmäki was partly consolidated with Jämsä in 2007. The municipality of Jämsänkoski was consolidated with Jämsä in the beginning of 2009.

It is the center of Finnish aeronautics industry – the aircraft factory and aeronautical engineering offices of Patria is located at Halli Airport in Jämsä.

Since 1994, the ski slope at Himos has been used as a super special stage at the Rally Finland.

Geography 

There are all together around 465 lakes in Jämsä; the largest lakes are Päijänne,  and Lake Kuorevesi. Jämsä is located on the watershed of the main catchment areas of the Kokemäki River and the Kymi River. The eastern and central areas of the municipality belong to the Kymi River watershed, the western ones to the Kokemäki River watershed. The catchment area of the Jämsä route of the first division phase of the Kymijoki main catchment area covers almost the entire area of Koskenpää and Jämsänkoski as well as the center of Jämsä and the central part of Jämsänniemi. The Great Päijänne area of the first division of the Kymi River watershed covers the eastern, south-eastern and southern areas of Jämsä. The catchment area of the Längelmävesi and Hauho routes of the first division of the Kokemäki River main catchment area covers the southwestern part of Jämsä, ie the southern part of Längelmäki and Kuorevesi. The catchment area of the Keuruu route in the first division phase of the Kokemäki River watershed covers the western and north-western part of Jämsä, ie the northern part of Kuorevesi and the westernmost parts of Koskenpää.

The bedrock of Jämsä belongs to the abyssal rock area of the Central Finland. The predominant species are coarse-grained granodiorites and granites, which are often porphyry and weathered in places. Rapakivi granite rock has also been found in the vicinity of Jämsä. The geological formation of the Inner Finland, which is similar to the Salpausselkä formations but younger than them, runs from Hämeenkangas in the north-west of Tampere through Orivesi and Jämsä to Laukaa. The meltwater of the Weichselian glaciation associated with its formation and melting has shaped several Jämsä valleys. The meltwater of the glacier flowed through the numerous transition valleys of the present-day Jämsä area.

Culture

Food
In the 1980s, Jämsä's traditional parish dishes were called liponen (meat cooked with turnip chips and barley groats), piimätalkkuna and grandma's buns.

Sports
Jämsänkosken Ilves is a sports club in Jämsä.

Himos Skiresort is located in Jämsä.

See also
 Längelmäki
 Länkipohja
 Battle of Länkipohja
 Jämsänkoski
 Jämsänkosken Ilves
 Jämsä sub-region
 Finnish national road 58

References

External links

 Town of Jämsä – Official website, finnish, english

 
Cities and towns in Finland
Populated places established in 1866
1866 establishments in the Russian Empire
Rally Finland